The Soprano Sax Concerto is a concerto for soprano saxophone and orchestra by the American composer Jennifer Higdon.  The work was originally commissioned by the Minnesota Commissioning Club as Higdon's Oboe Concerto and was premiered by oboist Kathy Greenbank and the Saint Paul Chamber Orchestra in 2005.  Higdon later reworked the composition, however, and the piece was premiered in its form as a saxophone concerto on August 3, 2007 at the Cabrillo Festival of Contemporary Music by the saxophonist Timothy McAllister and the Cabrillo Festival Orchestra under the conductor Marin Alsop.

Composition
The Soprano Sax Concerto has a duration of roughly 17 minutes and is composed in a single movement.  Higdon described her inspiration for the work in the score program notes, writing:
In a later interview with the San Francisco Chronicle, Higdon described the composition an "airplane-hotel project," remarking, "I had the piece on my laptop, and I could work on it while I was sitting in a lobby or an airport terminal.  The orchestral part stayed the same; it was just a matter of changing some of the solo notes."

Instrumentation
The work is scored for a solo soprano saxophone and an orchestra comprising two flutes (2nd doubling piccolo), oboe (doubling English horn), two clarinets, two bassoons, two French horns, two trumpets, one percussionist, and strings.

Reception
Reviewing the world premiere, Jeff Dunn of the San Francisco Classical Voice praised the concerto, writing, "This was a rewrite of her 2005 Oboe Concerto (which I have not heard), and it was superbly realized by soloist Timothy McAllister. Higdon is now the most-performed living composer in the U.S. and Canada — deservedly so. Her melodic and orchestration skills are formidable, and she can reach audiences without having to pander to them."  He added, "The single-movement concerto consisted of long stretches of ever-evolving melisma, with phrases cleverly imitated by other solo instruments in a way that seemed to weave a tapestry to the glory of melody. This work, and perhaps the oboe concerto as well, is a significant testament to beauty."  The conductor Marin Alsop, who gave the Soprano Sax Concerto its world premiere, described the piece as "a lyrical and poignant essay for sax and orchestra".

See also
List of compositions by Jennifer Higdon

References

Concertos by Jennifer Higdon
2007 compositions
Higdon